Jason Arneil Campbell (born 30 November 1985) is a Nevisian cricketer who has played for the Leeward Islands in West Indian domestic cricket. He is a slow left-arm orthodox bowler.

Campbell made his senior debut for the Leewards during the 2011–12 Regional Super50, against Jamaica. His first-class and Twenty20 debuts both came later in the season, in the Regional Four Day Competition and Caribbean Twenty20, respectively. After the 2011–12 season, Campbell did not again play for the Leewards until January 2015, when he featured in a Regional Super50 fixture against Trinidad and Tobago.

References

External links
Player profile and statistics at CricketArchive
Player profile and statistics at ESPNcricinfo

1985 births
Living people
Leeward Islands cricketers
Nevisian cricketers